Jason Brooks may refer to:
 Jason Brooks (illustrator) (born 1969), illustrator based in London
 Jason Brooks (actor) (born 1966), American actor
 Jason Brooks (painter) (born 1968), British painter and sculptor